December Avenue may refer to:

 December Avenue (band), a five-piece indie pop/alternative rock band from Manila, Philippines
 December Avenue (album), the self-titled debut studio album by December Avenue
 December Avenue (Stańko album), an album by Polish jazz trumpeter and composer Tomasz Stańko